Malcolm Elliott (born 1 July 1961) is a former English professional cyclist, whose professional career has lasted from 1984 to 1997 when he retired and from 2003 up to 2011 when he made his comeback in British domestic racing.

Known as a sprinter, his career includes three stages and the points classification in the Vuelta a España, two gold medals in the Commonwealth Games, and winning the amateur Milk Race and its professional version, the Kellogg's Tour. He rode and finished the Tour de France in 1987 and 1988. Elliott also competed at the Olympic Games in 1980 and 1996.

Early life and amateur career
Elliott was brought up in the Wadsley area of Sheffield. He joined Rutland Cycling Club in Sheffield at 15 where he was selected for the British team for the world junior championship in Argentina in 1979. In 1980 riding for Rutland CC, Elliott won the British National Hill Climb Championships, beating Jeff Williams by one fifth of a second. He also raced for the UV Aube cycling club in Troyes, France, for part of 1980 season to gain experience of racing on the continent before being selected for the British team pursuit at the 1980 Summer Olympics in Moscow. He, Sean Yates and Tony Doyle finished seventh.

Elliott's breakthrough came at the 1982 Commonwealth Games in Brisbane where he first took gold in the team time trial and then again in the 184 kilometre road race by outsprinting Steve Bauer, Roger Sumich, Steve Lawrence and Russell Harrington.

1983 was Elliott's final year as an amateur and he took six stages of the Milk Race and was also third overall in the Circuit des Ardennes before turning professional with Raleigh-Weinmann in 1984. Further domestic success followed in 1984 and 1985 before switching to the ANC–Halfords Cycling Team for the 1987 season, alongside Graham Jones, Paul Watson and Joey McLoughlin.

Professional career
ANC–Halfords raced on the continent as well as in Britain. Elliott finished third in the 1987 Amstel Gold Race. The team received an invitation to the 1987 Tour de France with Elliott finishing 94th overall and third on the stage into Bordeaux.

In 1988 Elliott joined the Fagor team, led by Stephen Roche. Elliott took his first stage in the Vuelta a España that year and another two in 1989, by which time he had switched to the Spanish Teka team riding alongside fellow British rider Darryl Webster. He rode in Europe until the end of 1992 when he signed for the American team, Chevrolet–LA Sheriffs.

Elliott had many wins for Chevrolet, winning the First Union Grand Prix in 1993 and 1994 and the Redlands Classic in 1993 and 1994, and two stage wins in the Tour DuPont in 1993 and 1995. In 1996 he was then selected for the Olympic Games road race, but finished a disappointing seventy ninth. The race was won by Pascal Richard. In 1997 he moved to Comptel–Colorado Cyclist but the team hit financial trouble. That led Elliott to retire at the end of 1997 aged 36.

Comeback

Elliott returned at the start of 2003 at 41. Riding as an individual for the Pinarello-Assos squad (set up by his former manager at ANC–Halfords, Phil Griffiths), he won in the Havant International GP and stages in the Irish Milk Ras. In 2004, he won the season long Premier Calendar, and the National Elite Circuit Series. For 2006 Elliott signed for Plowman Craven team and again won the National Elite Circuit Series. On 24 August 2006 in St. Johann, Austria, he became UCI road masters world champion.

In 2007 he won the UCI 1.2 ranked International CiCle Classic, and the Shay Elliott Memorial, the Irish one-day classic.

In 2009 he was inducted into the British Cycling Hall of Fame.

For the 2010 season, Elliott raced with the newly launched Motorpoint Pro-Cycling Team. The ten-strong team, based in Stone in Staffordshire, saw Elliott managed by Keith Lambert and the team run by Phil Griffiths. The team competed in such high-profile races as the Tour of Britain and 'UK Tour Series' – the city centre-based cycling race series broadcast on TV, in which Elliott won the Durham round and the Motorpoint team took overall honours. On 16 May 2010 he set the record for completing the Etape du Dales sportive in 5 hours and 43 minutes. He left the roster after the 2011 season, but remained with the team as a sporting director.

Doping
In 1992 Elliott failed a dope test on stages 3 and 5 of the Tour of Andalucia, testing positive for nandrolone, an anabolic steroid. As the two tests were so close this was treated as a single infraction and he was stripped of the win on stage 3.

Major results

1979
 3rd National Junior Road Race Series
1980
 1st  National Hill Climb Championships
1981
 2nd National Hill Climb Championships
1982
 Commonwealth Games
1st  Road race
1st  Team time trial
 3rd Overall Sealink International Grand Prix
1983
 1st Premier Calendar
 1st Lincoln Grand Prix
 1st Tour of the Peak
 3rd Overall Circuit des Ardennes
 3rd Milk Race
1st Six stages
1984
 1st  National Criterium Championships
 1st  Sealink International Grand Prix
 10th Overall Milk Race
1985
 1st  Individual pursuit, National Track Championships
13th Milk Race
 1st  Overall Herald Sun Tour
1st Stages 1, 2, 12 & 16
1986
 2nd Overall Milk Race
1st Two stages
 3rd Overall Herald Sun Tour
1st Stages 6 & 16
1987
 1st  Overall Milk Race
1st Five stages
 Nissan Classic
1st Stages 1, 4b & 5
 1st Stage 4 Herald Sun Tour
 3rd Amstel Gold Race
1988
 1st  Overall Tour of Britain
1st Prologue & Stage 1
 1st Stage 17 Vuelta a España
 1st Stage 3 Vuelta a Aragón
 1st Stage 13 Herald Sun Tour
 2nd Overall Nissan Classic
1989
 Vuelta a España
1st  Points classification
1st Stages 3b & 11
 Setmana Catalana de Ciclisme
1st Prologue & Stages 1 & 5
 Vuelta a Castilla y León
1st Stages 3 & 5
 1st Prologue Tour of Britain
 1st Stage 2 Tour of Galicia
 1st Stage 4 Vuelta a Burgos
 2nd Tour of the Americas
1990
 1st  Overall Milk Race
 Volta a Catalunya
1st Stages 1 & 3
 Vuelta a Cantabria
1st Stage 1 & 4a
 1st Stage 1 Tour of the Basque Country
 1st Stage 1 Tour of Britain
1991
 1st Trofeo Masferrer
 Troféu Joaquim Agostinho
1st Stages 3a & 6
 6th Overall Tour Méditerranéen
1992
 1st Stage 4 Vuelta a los Valles Mineros
 1st Stage 5 Volta ao Alentejo
 2nd Overall Vuelta a Castilla y León
 3rd Clásica de Sabiñánigo
 6th Trofeo Masferrer
1993
 1st  Road race, National Road Championships
 1st  Overall Redlands Classic
1st Stage
 1st Overall Tour of Bisbee
1st Stage
 1st Stage 6 Tour DuPont
 1st First Union Grand Prix
1994
 1st  Overall Redlands Classic
 Killington Stage Race
1st Two stages
 1st First Union Grand Prix
1995
 Killington Stage Race
1st Two stages
 1st Stage 1 Tour DuPont
 1st Stage Tour de Toona
1996
 1st Killington Stage Race
 1st Manhattan Beach GP
1997
 1st Jackson Criterium
2003
 1st Havant International GP
 3rd Premier Calendar
2004
 1st Premier Calendar
 Girvan 3-Day
1st 2 stages
 5th Overall Rás Tailteann
1st Stages 5 & 8
2005
 1st Beaumont Trophy
 2nd Overall Rás Tailteann
1st  Points classification
1st Stage 4
2006
 1st UCI road masters world champion
 1st British Elite Circuit Series Champion
2007
 1st Shay Elliott Memorial Race
 1st East Midlands International Cicle Classic
 1st Newport Nocturne
2008
 1st Circuit de Stone
 3rd East Midlands International Cicle Classic
 5th Rogaland Grand Prix
 5th Grand Prix of Wales

References

Bibliography
Sprinter, Malcolm Elliott with Jeff Connor,

External links

1961 births
Living people
Cyclists from Yorkshire
Cyclists at the 1980 Summer Olympics
Cyclists at the 1996 Summer Olympics
Doping cases in cycling
Olympic cyclists of Great Britain
Sportspeople from Sheffield
British cycling road race champions
Directeur sportifs
British Vuelta a España stage winners
Commonwealth Games gold medallists for England
Commonwealth Games medallists in cycling
Cyclists at the 1982 Commonwealth Games
People from Wadsley
Medallists at the 1982 Commonwealth Games